Zuwara Berber or Twillult language (also: Zuara, Zwara, (Berber name: Twillult) is a Berber dialect, one of the Berber Zenati languages. It is spoken in Zuwara city, located on the coast of western Tripolitania in northwestern Libya.

Several works of Terence Mitchell, most notably Zuaran Berber (Libya): Grammar and texts,<ref>Terence Frederick Mitchell, Zuaran Berber (Libya): Grammar and Texts, Rüdiger Köppe: Köln 2009</ref> provide an overview of the language's grammar along with a set of texts, based mainly on the speech of his consultant Ramadan Azzabi. Some articles on this subject were also published by Luigi Serra.

The speakers refer to their specific variety of the language as twillult /t.ˈwil.lult/ ‘the language of Willul’, and the word "Mazigh" /ˈma.ziʁ/ may refer both to the wider Amazigh language or to any Amazigh person.  Although rare for a Berber idiom, the masculine form is used to refer to the language.Ethnologue'' considers this language a dialect of Nafusi, although the two belong to different branches of Berber according to Kossmann (1999).

Number of Speakers 
By some estimates, 297,000 people speak Zuwara Berber or a similar dialect. Approximately 247,000 of these speakers reside in Libya.

Writing System 
This language uses the Naskh variant of the Arabic script.

Phonology 
Zuwara Berber has many consonants compared to vowels. However, words can end in both consonants and vowels. For instance, the Latinized words "ˈa.man" and "ˈa.nu" mean "water" and "water well" in English, respectively.

Consonants 
Zuwara Berber has a total of 31 consonants.

Vowels 
Zuwara Berber has a total of four vowels: /i/, /u/, /ə/, and /a/.

Prosody

Stress 
In roughly 85% of words, the stress goes on the penultimate syllable, especially for native Zuwara Berber words. For instance, the Latinized word "a.ˈzi.zaw" means "green" in English and has three syllables. Thus, the stress is on the second syllable, "ˈzi".

References

Berber languages
Berbers in Libya
Languages of Libya
Tripolitania